Dongchun Gymnasium is a multi-purpose indoor sporting arena located in Jung-gu, Ulsan, South Korea. The capacity of the arena is 5,831. It was opened in January 2001 after several setbacks and problems with its construction.

External links
Official website 

Sports venues completed in 2001
Indoor arenas in South Korea
Sport in Ulsan
Basketball venues in South Korea
Buildings and structures in Ulsan
2001 establishments in South Korea